The Sound of Your Heart (also known as The Sound of Your heart, Sound of Heart) is a South Korean webtoon series written and illustrated by Jo Seok. The webtoon was first released on the Naver WEBTOON internet portal in 2006.  In 2007, the first print volume was released and The Sound of Your Heart was adapted into a TV series of the same name in 2015. It was completed in July 2020.

Development 
Jo Seok graduated from Jeonju University with a major in video cultural studies in 2002, and wanted to infuse an interest in cartoons to those who haven't been fans of graphic novels. Jo began posting The Sound of Heart on Naver Webtoon in September 2006, and by 2014 it was the longest running webtoon on the platform. On December 17, 2015, the 1,000th episode of The Sound of Heart was posted on Naver. Since Jo started posting his webcomic on Naver, views averaged 5 million per update, a total of over 5 billion views.

When Jo got married in 2014, he did not have a wedding ceremony or honeymoon trip because he did not want a lapse in his update schedule. In 2015, Jo earned about ₩78,000,000 per month (approximately ₩936,000,000 per year).

Jo published other webcomics on Naver Webtoon during the run of The Sound of Heart, such as Jo's Area and Moon You. The Sound of Heart concluded in July 2020, after running for 14 years. Jo said he felt "lucky to be able to feel 'done' with the comic." During its run, the webtoon accumulated nearly 7 billion views and 15 million comments. 500 episodes had been translated into English by the time The Sound of Heart concluded.

Characters

In The Sound of Heart, most characters are based on people in the author's life.

Main 
Jo Seok: The author himself in his comic.
Choi Ae-bong: Jo's girlfriend, and, since June 2014, wife.
Jo Joon: Jo's brother.
Jo Cheol-wang: Jo's father. He was a rugby player and owner of a chicken restaurant.
Kwon Jeong-kwon: Jo's mother.
Jo Yool-bong: Jo and Ae-bong's daughter.
Choi Ko-bong, Ae-bong's younger brother. Internet instructor and police officer.

Dogs 

 Sensation, Jo's pet dog
 Hengbong, Jo's pet dog
 Sol and Taeyang, dogs raised at Ae-bong's house.
 Kobongi, Ae-bong's pet dog

Jo's Friends 

 Kim Joongoo: General editor of Naver Webtoon.
 Buwook, Flower human.
 Seouldae(Seoul National University in Korean), Buwook's elder brother.

Other media
On 7 November 2016, airline carrier Air Seoul announced that it had collaborated with Naver Webtoon to produce pre-flight safety video. Characters from The Sound of Heart were featured in the video, alongside characters from webtoons such as Denma and Noblesse.

Animated series
On September 20, 2018, the first animated short series based on The Sound of Heart was released on Naver WEBTOON YouTube Channel.

Television series

KBS had been planning a TV series involving The Sound of Heart since 2015. Lee Kwang-soo was cast to portray Jo Seok, and Jung So-min is cast to portray Choi Ae-bong. The series was also picked up by Netflix and was broadcast on both channels simultaneously on February 24, 2017.

Netflix ran another series titled The Sound of Your Heart - Reboot, produced by Kross Pictures. This series began airing in October 2018 and ran for two seasons. In this adaptation, Cho Seok was portrayed by Sung Hoon and Lee Ae-bong was portrayed by Girls' Generation's Kwon Yuri.

Mobile game
Korean mobile game company Neowiz Games produced a mobile video game adaption of The Sound of Heart, launched on Google Play in April 2016. The fee is free and includes some paid item payment features. The latest update is on April 24, 2019 and is a game of RPG personality.

References

External links
 Official website on Naver WEBTOON
 English translation on WEBTOON

Manhwa titles
Naver Comics titles
2006 webtoon debuts
South Korean webtoons
Comedy webtoons
Slice of life comics
Comics adapted into television series
2000s webtoons
Webtoons in print
The Sound of Heart